Hirschau is a municipality in the Amberg-Sulzbach district, Upper Palatinate, Bavaria, Germany.

Geography 
Hirschau lies directly on the Bundesstraße 14 (Nuremberg - Rozvadov), 13 km northeast of Amberg and about 65 km east of Nuremberg. Apart from the main village Hirschau, the municipality consists of the following villages: 
Burgstall
Dienhof
Ehenfeld
Krickelsdorf
Kricklhof
Krondorf
Massenricht
Obersteinbach
Steiningloh
Untersteinbach
Weiher

Economy 
Kaolin, used for the production of porcelain, has been mined at Hirschau since 1901. Interesting is the Monte Kaolino, a 120 meter high mound made from 32,000,000 tons of quartz sand from excess sand in years of operation. It is now used as a (sand) skiing/camping resort during the summer months. It is also the place where the yearly Sandboarding Championships are held.

References 

Amberg-Sulzbach